Broadcom Inc. is an American designer, developer, manufacturer, and global supplier of a wide range of semiconductor and infrastructure software products. Broadcom's product offerings serve the data center, networking, software, broadband, wireless, storage, and industrial markets. As of 2022, some 78 percent of Broadcom's revenue was coming from its semiconductor-based products and 22 percent from its infrastructure software products and services.

Tan Hock Eng is the company's president and CEO. The company is headquartered in San Jose, California. Avago Technologies Limited took the Broadcom part of the Broadcom Corporation name after acquiring it in January 2016. The ticker symbol AVGO which represented old Avago now represents the newly merged entity. The Broadcom Corporation ticker symbol BRCM was retired. At first the merged entity was known as Broadcom Ltd., before assuming the present name.

Broadcom has a long history of corporate transactions (or attempted transactions) with other prominent corporations mainly in the high-technology space.

In October 2019, the European Union issued an interim antitrust order against Broadcom concerning anticompetitive business practices which allegedly violate European Union competition law.

History

Origin in Hewlett-Packard 
The company that would later become Broadcom Inc. was established in 1961 as HP Associates, a semiconductor products division of Hewlett-Packard. 

The division separated from Hewlett-Packard as part of the Agilent Technologies spinoff in 1999.

Formation of Avago Technologies 

KKR and Silver Lake Partners acquired the Semiconductor Products Group of Agilent Technologies in 2005 for $2.6 billion and formed Avago Technologies. Avago Technologies agreed to sell its I/O solutions unit to PMC-Sierra for $42.5 million in October 2005. 

In August 2008, the company filed an initial public offering of $400 million. In October 2008, Avago Technologies acquired Infineon Technologies' Munich-based bulk acoustic wave business for €21.5 million. 

On 6 August 2009, Avago Technologies went public on NASDAQ with the ticker symbol AVGO.

Avago Technologies announced its agreement to acquire CyOptics, an optical chip and component supplier, for $400 million in April 2013. The acquisition aimed to expand Avago Technologies' fiber optics product portfolio. In October 2013, Avago Technologies invested $5 million in Amantys, a power electronics technology provider, as part of a strategic investment agreement between the two companies. 

Avago Technologies announced its agreement to acquire LSI Corporation in December 2013 for $6.6 billion. The acquisition helped move Avago Technologies away from specialized products and towards a more mainstream industry, which included chips, especially storage for data centers.

The company sold its SSD controller business to Seagate Technology in May 2014. In August 2014, the company was the ninth-largest semiconductor company. Avago Technologies agreed to sell LSI's Axxia Networking business to Intel for $650 million. The company also agreed to buy PLX Technology, an integrated circuits designer, for $309 million. In February 2015, it was announced that Avago Technologies Limited had reached an agreement to acquire Emulex Corporation for $8 per share in cash.

Acquisition of and change of name to Broadcom Ltd 

On 28 May 2015, Avago announced that it would buy Broadcom Corporation for $37 billion ($17 billion cash and $20 billion in shares). The combined company, which would be named Broadcom Ltd., would have annual revenue of $15 billion and a market value of $77 billion. Broadcom Corp. strengthened Avago Technologies' patent position significantly in sectors such as mobile, the data center, and the Internet of Things and made the company the ninth largest holder of patents among the top semiconductor vendors, according to an analysis by technology consulting firm LexInnova. According to the company's website, the transaction closed on 1 February 2016.

In May 2016, Cypress Semiconductor announced that it will acquire Broadcom Corporation's full portfolio of IoT products for $550 million. Under the deal, Cypress acquires Broadcom's IoT products and intellectual property for Wi-Fi, Bluetooth and Zigbee connectivity, as well as Broadcom's WICED platform and SDK for developers. The deal combined Broadcom's developer tools and connectivity technologies for IoT devices with Cypress' own programmable system-on-a-chip (SoC) products that provide memory, computing and graphics processing for low-power devices.

Foreign investment reviews and change of name to Broadcom Inc 
In 2016, Broadcom proposed merging with Brocade Communications Systems. The merger was delayed for review by the Committee on Foreign Investment in the United States. On 2 November 2017, Broadcom announced it would relocate its legal address from Singapore to Delaware, which would avoid the review. This action was linked to the parent company being renamed from Broadcom Ltd. to Broadcom Inc. The pre-2016-merger Broadcom, Broadcom Corp., remains a wholly owned subsidiary of the renamed parent Broadcom Inc.

In mid-November 2017, Broadcom proposed to purchase Qualcomm for US$130 billion, which was rebuffed by Qualcomm's board. The proposed hostile takeover, which was later revised to $117 billion, was blocked by the Trump administration by an executive order that cited national security concerns. Specifically, the Committee on Foreign Investment in the United States expressed concerns that, due to Broadcom's close ties with China and Chinese chipmaker Huawei, the deal would result in Huawei gaining dominance in 5G and other technologies to the detriment of U.S. national security. However, critics of the move stated that the decision was motivated by competitiveness more than security concerns. In other words, on March 12, 2018, President Donald Trump blocked a hostile takeover of Qualcomm by Broadcom. The chipmaker had offered over $117B for Qualcomm, and nominated 11 rival directors to its board, but the deal was barred in the interest of national security. Broadcom, then headquartered in Singapore, was considered too close to China and chipmaker Huawei. "A shift to Chinese dominance in 5G would have substantial negative national security consequences for the United States," CFIUS said. "While the United States remains dominant in the standards-setting space currently, China would likely compete robustly to fill any void left by Qualcomm as a result of this hostile takeover." Others have stated that Mr. Trump's decision was as consistent with balance of trade objectives as it was with security concerns.

Move into software 
Historically a semiconductor-based-only company, the failure of the Qualcomm bid led Broadcom and its CEO to look at acquiring infrastructure software as an alternative way of growing in size. On 11 July 2018, news sources reported that Broadcom and CA Technologies agreed on terms for an $18.9 billion acquisition. CA Technologies, formerly known as Computer Associates, was a longtime giant in software for mainframe computers that had expanded its offerings into software for cloud computing. And on 5 November 2018, Broadcom announced that it had completed the acquisition of CA Technologies.

On 9 August 2019, news sources reported that Broadcom had decided to acquire the enterprise security business of Symantec Corporation (the consumer software portion of which is now known as NortonLifeLock) for $10.7 billion in cash. The deal continued Broadcom's push into software critical for corporate infrastructure. And on 4 November 2019, Broadcom announced that it had completed the acquisition of the business, as well as the Symantec name and brand. 

In 2019, Broadcom was announced the fifth best performing stock of the 2010s, with a total return of 1,956%.

Anti-competitive practices investigations 
On January 17, 2018, it was reported that the FTC had investigating Broadcom for several months in regard to its anti-competitive tactics while negotiating with customers.

In October 2019, Broadcom was ordered by the European Union to stop allegedly anticompetitive practices. 
In 2021, Broadcom agreed to settle an antitrust complaint which claimed it had abused its monopoly power through restrictive contract terms and threats of retaliation against non-compliant customers. Such contract terms stifle innovation and inevitably lead to higher prices. European Competition Commissioner Margrethe Vestager said that Broadcom’s contract terms with six main customers would “create serious and irreversible harm to competition” if no action were taken.

In 2021, Broadcom agreed to settle an antitrust complaint, in which the U.S. Federal Trade Commission claimed that the company abused its monopoly power using restrictive contract terms and threats of retaliation against customers the company deemed "disloyal." The company faced a similar antitrust proceeding with the European Commission, which was settled after Broadcom committed to refrain from certain business practices. This included a commitment to suspend agreements containing exclusivity or quasi-exclusivity arrangements and a commitment not to enter into such agreements for seven years.

Patent suits 
In 2017, Broadcom filed patent suits against smart TV manufacturers. The U.S. International Trade Commission ruled in favor of the smart TV manufacturers. In other words, back in 2017, Broadcom filed an array of patent suits against manufacturers of smart TVs. In 2018, the U.S. International Trade Commission ruled against Broadcom, finding that two manufacturers did not infringe on patents owned by Broadcom.

In 2020, Broadcom sued Netflix over multiple patent infringements. Critics have argued that Broadcom is suing Netflix for being more successful, citing the declining number of traditional pay television subscribers due to the rise of streaming services. The Leichtman Research Group calculated that the largest pay TV providers in the U.S. – representing about 95% of the market – lost about 4,915,000 net video subscribers in 2019. Regular customers each pay $231 a year for their boxes. That's almost 20 billion dollars a year in profit for the cable industry. In other words, in 2020, Broadcom sued Netflix over multiple patent infringements. Critics have argued that Broadcom is suing Netflix for being more successful. The traditional pay TV industry has undeniably lost a large number of subscribers, which may be because of the rise of new internet streaming services. The Leichtman Research Group calculated that the largest pay TV providers in the U.S. – representing about 95% of the market – lost about 4,915,000 net video subscribers in 2019.

2020s 

On January 7, 2020, Accenture PLC agreed to acquire Symantec's 300-person cybersecurity services division from Broadcom. In February 2020, Broadcom announced the world's first WiFi 6E client device, the BCM4389.
In early 2020, Raspberry Pi inc revealed that their new boards would have a Broadcom BCM2711 chip. This was a huge milstone for Broadcom, because their chip would be publicly available in a proper computer.

In May 2022, Broadcom announced their deal to acquire the virtualization and cloud computing software vendor VMware for $61 billion in a combination of cash and stock, with Broadcom assuming $8 billion in VMware debt. It was a bid for a third major acquisition in software for Broadcom, following those of CA Technologies and Symantec. In November 2022, the UK's Competition and Markets Authority regulator announced it would investigate whether the Broadcom Inc. acquisition of VMware Inc. would "result in a substantial lessening of competition within any market or markets in the United Kingdom for goods or services".

Products

Broadcom provides a broad range of semiconductor and infrastructure software applications that serve the data center (mainframes), networking, software, broadband, wireless, and storage and industrial markets. Common applications for its products include: data center networking, home connectivity, broadband access, telecommunications equipment, smartphones, base stations, data center servers and storage, factory automation, power generation and alternative energy systems, displays, and mainframe operations and management, and application software development.

Some of Broadcom's core technologies and franchise products include:

Networking devices

 Broadband Modems
 Wideband ADC/DACs
 Custom DSP & ARM CPUs
 Wi-Fi/Bluetooth/GPS devices

Optical technologies 
 Copper/Optical PHYs
 Switching Fabrics
 Analog & DSP SerDes
 FBAR & RF Front-Ends
 SAS/SATA/FC/PCIe/Read-Channel
 VCSEL/DFB Optics
 Optical Sensing
 Enterprise Infrastructure Software

Franchise products
 Cable/Sat/IP Set-Top Box SoCs
 Cable Modem/CMTS SoCs
 PON/DSL CPE/CO SoCs
 Wireless Connectivity Combos
 Ethernet NICs/Controllers/PHYs
 Ethernet Switching/Routing SoCs
 Network Processor SoCs
 RF Filter and Front-End Modules
 ASICs (Networking and Compute)
 HDD/SSD Controllers & HDD PreAmps
 Enterprise SAS/SATA/FC/PCIe
 Optical Isolation/Motion Encoders/LED
 Fiber Optic Products
 Mainframe Management & Analytics Software
 Enterprise Software Applications

Network interface controllers 
Vendors have included Broadcom NICs in their products. For example, Dell PowerEdge M-Series blade-server products may be fitted with Dell-supplied Dual Port Broadcom NetXtreme 5709 Gigabit Ethernet port adapters.

Data storage 
Systems on a chip (SoCs) for hardrives that embeds read channels, hard disk controllers, PHYs, and DDR memory interfaces on one single silicon chip.

Vulnerabilities in SoC WiFi stack
In April 2017, Google's Project Zero investigated Broadcom's SoC WiFi stack and found that it lacked "all basic exploit mitigations - including stack cookies, safe unlinking and access permission protection," allowing "full device takeover by Wi-Fi proximity alone, requiring no user interaction." Numerous smartphones, such as by Apple, Samsung and Google were affected.

Jericho2
Jericho2 is a programmable Ethernet switch chip that has up to  switching capacity per device.

Tomahawk 3
Tomahawk 3 series supports high-density, standards-based 400GbE, 200GbE, and 100GbE switching and routing for hyperscale cloud networks. Broadcom divulged that it is bringing two variants of the Tomahawk-3 to market. The second variant of the Tomahawk-3 has 160 of the 256 SerDes fired up and delivers  of aggregate bandwidth.

Software 
As of 2022 Broadcom has offered Enterprise software.

Symantec enterprise security 
Broadcom operates its enterprise security business under the Symantec brand; Broadcom purchased this business from NortonLifeLock (formerly known as Symantec) in 2019.

BizOps technology 
Broadcom also offers products for supporting BizOps, including:

 Clarity - product portfolio management
 Rally - agile development, Blaze CT- Shift-left testing
 DX Operational Intelligence - AIOps.
Agile Requirements Designer - model-based testing optimization of processes

See also 
 Broadcom Foundation

References

External links 

Manufacturing companies based in San Jose, California
Electronics companies established in 1961
American companies established in 1961
1961 establishments in California
Companies in the Nasdaq-100
Companies listed on the Nasdaq
Semiconductor companies of the United States
Fabless semiconductor companies
2009 initial public offerings
Broadcom
Computer storage companies